Interstate 505 (I-505) is a north–south auxiliary Interstate Highway in the Sacramento Valley in Northern California. It is a spur auxiliary route of I-5 that runs from near Dunnigan south to I-80 in Vacaville. I-505 is primarily a rural Interstate, but travels through Vacaville and the city of Winters. The highway is the primary route connecting the San Francisco Bay Area and the northern Sacramento Valley, bypassing Sacramento and its attendant city traffic. Thus, it is a major route for travelers heading directly from the San Francisco Bay Area to the Pacific Northwest.

Power lines connecting Path 15 to Path 66 follow the highway for a while, until one heads northeast and the other northwest.

Route description
The southern terminus of I-505 is at I-80 next to the Nut Tree Airport in the Nut Tree area in Vacaville. From there, it travels north about  through rural areas near the western edge of the Sacramento Valley before reaching Winters. I-505 then skirts the eastern city limits of Winters, intersecting with State Route 128—the only exit in Winters. After leaving that city, the Interstate then proceeds north through rural areas again for about  until it reaches its northern terminus with I-5 near Dunnigan.

I-505 is part of the California Freeway and Expressway System, and is part of the National Highway System, a network of highways that are considered essential to the country's economy, defense, and mobility by the Federal Highway Administration.

History
What is now I-505 was originally conceived as part of a loop Interstate with a directional suffix, I-5W. However, I-5W and most of the other Interstates around the country with directional suffixes were eventually renumbered or eliminated, except I-35E and I-35W in Texas and Minnesota. I-69 segments I-69W, I-69C, and I-69E in southern Texas have since been designated as well. The former route of I-5W now corresponds to I-580 from I-5 south of Tracy to Oakland, I-80 from Oakland to Vacaville, and I-505 from Vacaville to I-5 near Dunnigan.

The northernmost section of I-505, between SR 16 in Madison and I-5 near Dunnigan, opened in August 1977.

Exit list

See also

References

External links

California @ AARoads.com - I-505
Caltrans: Route 505 highway conditions
California Highways: I-505

05-5
05-5
5
505
Interstate 05-5
Interstate 05-5